Rhett John Gaven Lockyear (born 28 February 1983) is an Australian former professional cricket player, who played for the Sydney Thunder and the Tasmanian Tigers. He plays club cricket for Tasmania University Cricket Club.

Rhett is a right-handed middle order batsman who has recurentely been performing consistently for club side University. He has had limited opportunities to establish himself in the Tiger's line-up.

On 18–20 November 2007, he assisted the Australian national side as a 12th man during the Hobart Test against Sri Lanka. In the first innings, he was involved in the run out of Farveez Maharoof and caught Michael Vandort off the bowling of Mitchell Johnson. In the second innings he was involved in the run out of Dilhara Fernando.

In October 2011 he was a member of the Australian squad at the 2011 Hong Kong International Cricket Sixes tournament. In the opening game against Ireland, he captained the team and retired not out on 31 runs.

References

External links

1983 births
Living people
Australian cricketers
Tasmania cricketers
Hobart Hurricanes cricketers
Sydney Thunder cricketers
Cricketers from New South Wales